Wang Jianzheng (born February 1, 1987) is a Chinese amateur boxer. He competed at the 2008 Olympics at middleweight.

At the World Championships, he beat three unknown fighters before running into superstar Matvey Korobov and losing 3:22. His placement ensured his qualification for the Olympics in his native country, though. There he lost his first bout against Serhiy Derevyanchenko.

External links
Worlds 2007
sports-reference

Living people
Middleweight boxers
1987 births
Boxers at the 2008 Summer Olympics
Olympic boxers of China
Sportspeople from Qingdao
Chinese male boxers